Adélia Josefina de Castro Fonseca (Salvador, Bahia, 24 November 1827 — Rio de Janeiro, 9 December 1920) was a Brazilian poet. Her parents were Justiniano de Castro Rebello and Adriana de Castro Rebello. She married Inácio Joaquim da Fonseca. She published her poems in newspapers and books, and was a constant collaborator with the Almanaque de lembranças luso-brasileiro. Towards the end of her life, she entered the Convent of Santa Teresa, in Rio de Janeiro, adopting the name of Mother Maria José de Jesús.

Selected works 
 Echos de minha alma: poesias, 1865

References

Sources
 Coletânea de poetas Bahianos. (1951) Aloysio de Carvalho y Editora Minverva, page 272. (in Portuguese)

External links 
 
 Adelia Fonseca - in Wikisource

1827 births
1920 deaths
19th-century Brazilian women writers
19th-century Brazilian poets
19th-century Brazilian short story writers
Brazilian feminist writers
Brazilian journalists
Brazilian women poets
People from Salvador, Bahia
Brazilian women short story writers